Rybakówka  is a settlement in the administrative district of Gmina Człopa, within Wałcz County, West Pomeranian Voivodeship, in north-western Poland.

Demographics
The settlement has a population of 12.

References

Villages in Wałcz County
Kingdom of Poland